The National Museum of Qatar is a national museum in Doha, Qatar. The current building opened to the public on 28 March 2019, replacing the previous building which opened in 1975. The building was designed by architect Jean Nouvel who was inspired by the desert rose crystal, which can be found in Qatar. The museum site includes Sheikh Abdullah bin Jassim Al Thani's Palace, which is the heart of the Qatari national identity. As of 2013, the director of the museum is Sheikha Amna.

Collection

A tour of the museum takes visitors through a loop of galleries that address three major, interrelated themes. The galleries are loosely arranged in chronological order, beginning with exhibitions on the natural history of the desert and the Persian Gulf, artefacts from Bedouin culture, historical exhibitions on the tribal wars, the establishment of the Qatari state, and finally the discovery of oil to the present. The displays and installations that explore these themes present audiovisual displays with carefully selected treasures from the museum's collections. These collections currently consist of approximately 8,000 objects and include archaeological artefacts, architectural elements, heritage household and travelling objects, textiles and costumes, jewelry, decorative arts, books, and historical documents.

The museum's mission is to celebrate the culture, heritage, and future of Qatar and its people, embodying the pride and traditions of Qataris while offering international visitors a dialogue about rapid change and modernization.

Since its inauguration, the museum contained materials which signify Qatar's cultural heritage, such as Bedouin ethnographic materials, maritime artifacts and environmental items. Ancient artifacts, most of which are locally derived, are also housed in the museum.

Archaeological artifacts
British archaeologist Beatrice de Cardi and her team were commissioned to undertake expeditions in Qatar from November 1973 to January 1974 in order to collect artifacts to display in the museum. Their most significant discoveries were at the site of Al Da'asa, which contained numerous Ubaid potsherds dating to the Neolithic period. Artifacts from the earlier Danish expeditions launched throughout the 1950s and 1960s, previously housed at the Doha Public Library, were also put on display in the museum.

The museum's antiquities department had an active role in surveys and excavations after De Cardi's expedition ended. They excavated the archaeological sites of Al Wusail and Zubarah.

Ethnographic materials
Materials documenting Bedouin ethnography range widely in theme. Certain objects on display were historically used as tools and weapons by the Bedouin, whereas others are products such as jewellery, pottery and costumes. Traditional poems are featured in the museum; most notable are works composed by Qatari ibn al-Fuja'a and former emir Jassim bin Mohammed Al Thani.

In 2015, Sheikh Mubarak bin Saif Al Thani presented the first written draft of the anthem to the Qatar National Museum to be put on display. It was originally scheduled to be moved to the new museum upon its completion.

History

Upon Khalifa bin Hamad Al Thani's accession to the throne in 1972, he drew up plans for a national museum in order to document the country's heritage and traditions. That year, he contracted Michael Rice & Company to design the structural and functional aspects of the museum. It was decided that the building would enclose the Old Amiri Palace, a dilapidated early-20th century palace previously occupied by Qatar's former emir, Abdullah bin Jassim Al Thani. A lagoon was also created to provide a venue for showcasing traditional dhows and pearling equipment.

Originally named the Qatar National Museum, it was inaugurated on 23 June 1975. Originally, its facilities included a 100-seat auditorium and a library. In 1980, the museum was awarded the Aga Khan Award for Architecture. The royal palace which the museum was built around was refurbished in 2015 in preparation for the opening of the new museum.

New building

The new building was constructed on the site of the old building. It was designed by Pritzker Prize-winning architect Jean Nouvel who was inspired by the desert rose and grows around the original twentieth century palace of Sheikh Abdullah bin Jassim Al Thani. The historic palace was restored by Berlin-based architecture and engineering firm ZRS Architekten Ingenieure. This important monument to Qatar's past is now preserved as the heart of the new NMoQ. The relation between the new building and the old building is part of creating the bridge between the past and the present advocated by Sheikha Al Mayassa as a way to "define ourselves instead of forever being defined by others […]" and of "celebrating our identity".

The 430,000 square foot (40,000 m2) museum is made up of interlocking discs that create cavities to protect visitors from the desert heat. Located on a 1.5 million ft² site at the south end of Doha's Corniche, the NMoQ building rises from the sea and is connected to the shore by two pedestrian bridges and a road bridge.

Originally, the museum was scheduled to open in 2016, but its opening was pushed back to 28 March 2019. Time magazine named it one of the World's Greatest Places to Visit in 2019, citing the integration of "immersive video screens and dioramas" into Jean Nouvel's architectural design.

The museum welcomed more than 450,000 visitors in less than a year of its opening. The  museum attracts people as it depicts Qatar's history not through paintings and sculptures but with 21st-century lights, sounds and visuals.

Contractor

The main building was contracted to a Korea-based company; Hyundai Engineering & Construction in 2011. The project involved the construction of the new National Museum next to the existing Qatar National Museum, which is located across from the Doha Corniche. The museum is designed according to the Bedouin tradition of Qatar. It includes a building in the shape of a desert rose and a 1.2 million ft² landscaped park. The project also includes a 115,000 m2 park with an artificial lagoon and parking spaces for 400 vehicles, a 220-seat auditorium, a research center, laboratories, a dedicated food forum, two restaurants, a café, and two museum shops, one for children.

Exhibitions 

 "Pipilotti Rist: Your Brain to Me, My Brain to You",Curated by Tom Eccles and Bouthayna Baltaj, March 2022 to January 2023.
 "A Sneak Peek at Qatar Auto Museum Project", March 2022 to January 2023.
 "On the Move", October 2022 to January 2023
 "The Majlis: A Meeting Place", November 2022 to March 2023.

See also
 List of museums in Qatar
 Qatar Museums
 Culture of Qatar

References

Bibliography

External links
 

 
Museums in Qatar
Decorative arts museums
Islamic museums
Jean Nouvel buildings
Religious museums in Qatar
Buildings and structures in Doha
Cultural infrastructure completed in 2019
Art museums established in 1975
1975 establishments in Qatar